These are the official results of the Women's 1.500 metres event at the 1996 Summer Olympics in Atlanta, Georgia. There were a total of 32 competitors.

Medalists

Results

Heats
Qualification: First 6 in each heat (Q) and the next 6 fastest (q) qualified to the semifinals.

Semifinals
Qualification: First 4 in each heat (Q) and the next 2 fastest (q) qualified to the final.

Final

See also
Men's 1500 metres

References

External links
 Official Report
 Results

1
1500 metres at the Olympics
1996 in women's athletics
Women's events at the 1996 Summer Olympics